Bodyke GAA is a Gaelic Athletic Association club located in the village of Bodyke in East Clare, Ireland. The club fields teams exclusively in hurling competitions.

The grounds "Páirc na Dishealbhaithe" were officially opened on 20 May 2000.

Major Honours
 Clare Senior Hurling Championship (2): 1947, 1975 (as Brian Boru's with Killanena & Tulla)
 Clare Intermediate Hurling Championship (5): 1932, 1936, 1946, 1969, 1996
 Clare Junior A Hurling Championship (7): 1929, 1942 (as Tuamgraney), 1946, 1957 (as Tuamgraney), 1961, 1986, 2017

References

Gaelic games clubs in County Clare
Hurling clubs in County Clare